White Friday occurred during the Italian Front of World War I, when an avalanche struck Austro-Hungarian barracks on Mount Marmolada, killing 270 soldiers. Other avalanches the same day struck Italian and other Austro-Hungarian positions, killing hundreds. According to some reports both sides deliberately fired shells into the weakened snowpacks in an attempt to bury the other side.

An accurate estimation of the number of casualties from the White Friday avalanches is not available. Historical documents suggest at least 2,000 victims among the soldiers and a few dozens among civilians.

The date 13 December, marked Saint Lucia, a commemorative religious holiday practiced by the majority of Italian Catholics. Though the occurrence of avalanches in the Dolomites Mountains took place on a Wednesday in 1916, the term  "White Friday" was used to coin the disastrous day.

Gran Poz summit Avalanches 
The Austro-Hungarian Kaiserschützen military barracks was built on the Gran Poz summit (approximately 11,000 ft, approximately 3.35km, above sea level) of Mount Marmolada. The wooden barracks was built in August of the summer of 1916, to house the men of the 1st Battalion of the Imperial Rifle Regiment Nr.III (1.Btl. KschRgt.III). The location of the barracks was planned to be well situated to protect it from Italian attack and provide a defense atop the contested Mount Marmolada. The barracks was placed along rock cliffs to protect it from direct enemy fire and the location was out of high-angle mortar range.

During the winter of 1916, heavy snowfall and a sudden thaw in the Alps created conditions ripe for avalanches. From the beginning of December, the snow pile up was recorded at  atop the summit. The Austro-Hungarian commander of the 1.Btl. KschRgt.III, Captain Rudolf Schmid, noticed the imminent danger his company faced. Out of fear his position would be soon untenable, Capt. Schmid wrote a request to his superior, Field Marshal Lieutenant Ludwig Goiginger of the 60th Infantry Division. The appeal was ultimately turned down to vacate the base atop Gran Poz summit. In the eight days before the avalanche, additional heavy snowfall disrupted telephone lines of communication and left each outpost stranded with a lack of supplies.

On , at 5:30 a.m., over 200,000 tons (approx. 1 million cubic metres) of snow and ice plunged down the mountainside directly onto the barracks. The wooden buildings packed with soldiers, collapsed under the weight of the avalanche, crushing the occupants. Of the 321 troops present, 229 were Kaiserschützen mountain infantry and 102 were Bosnians from a support column. Only a few were pulled to safety while 270 were buried alive. Only 40 of the bodies were ever recovered from the pileup. Among those who survived was Captain Schmid along with his aide, who escaped slightly injured.

Val Ciampi d'Arei Avalanches 
On the night of 13 December, an avalanche struck an Italian division of the 7th Alpini, overrunning their mountain barracks. The Italians called the disastrous day La Santa Lucia Nera after Saint Lucia.

Aftermath 
In the aftermath of White Friday, 10,000 soldiers on all sides were killed in December from avalanches. Altogether, it constituted the greatest number of deaths caused by snow/ice debris from avalanches in history. When including all avalanche-related deaths (this includes mud and rock slides triggered subsequently by an avalanche), White Friday is the second-worst avalanche-related disaster recorded, after the 1970 Huascarán avalanche.

See also 
 List of deadliest avalanches
 Rigopiano avalanche
 White War

Media
Literature

Swedish Power Metal Band Sabaton wrote and performed the song “Soldier of Heaven” on their 2022 album The War to End all Wars paying tribute and commemorating the soldiers died during the avalanche.

References 

1916 in Austria-Hungary
1916 in Italy
1916 natural disasters
December 1916 events
20th-century avalanches
Avalanches in Italy
Austria-Hungary in World War I
History of Trentino
History of Veneto
Military history of Italy during World War I
Marmolada